Elena Popescu (born 6 September 1989, Chișnău) is a Moldovan middle-distance runner. At the 2012 Summer Olympics, she competed in the Women's 800 metres.

References

Moldovan female middle-distance runners
Living people
Sportspeople from Chișinău
Olympic athletes of Moldova
Athletes (track and field) at the 2012 Summer Olympics
1989 births